Gardenia angkorensis is a species of plant in the family Rubiaceae native to Hainan in China and Cambodia.

References

angkorensis